The 2019 NCAA Division II men's basketball tournament is the 63rd annual single-elimination tournament to determine the national champion of men's NCAA Division II college basketball in the United States. Featuring sixty-four teams, it began on March 16, and concluded with the championship game on March 30.

The eight regional winners met in the Elite Eight for the quarterfinal, semifinal, and championship rounds. The Elite Eight was held at the Ford Center in Evansville, Indiana.  The tournament concluded with Northwest Missouri State winning its 2nd national title completing a 38-0 season.

Qualification
A total of 64 bids are available for each tournament: 24 automatic bids (awarded to the champions of the twenty-two Division II conferences) and 40 at-large bids.

The sixty-four bids are allocated evenly among the eight NCAA-designated regions (Atlantic, Central, East, Midwest, South, South Central, Southeast, and West), each of which contains three of the twenty-four Division II conferences that sponsor men's basketball. Each region consists of three automatic qualifiers (the teams who won their respective conference tournaments) and five at-large bids (which are awarded regardless of conference affiliation).

Seven teams qualified for their first NCAA Division II tournament in 2019: Concordia-Irvine, Daemen, Emmanuel, Molloy, Notre Dame (Ohio), Nova Southeastern, and Walsh. Six of these teams lost their first round game, with Nova Southeastern not only hosting the South Regional Tournament, but winning it, as well, advancing to the Elite Eight, before losing to St. Anselm.

Regionals

Atlantic – Indiana, Pennsylvania
Location: Kovalchick Convention and Athletic Complex

* – Denotes overtime period

Central – Maryville, Missouri
Location: Bearcat Arena

* – Denotes overtime period

East – Goffstown, New Hampshire
Location: Stoutenburgh Gymnasium

* – Denotes overtime period

Midwest – Romeoville, Illinois
Location: Neil Carey Arena

South – Fort Lauderdale, Florida
Location: Rick Case Arena

Southeast – Charlotte, North Carolina
Location: Levine Center

* – Denotes overtime period

South Central – Canyon, Texas
Location: First United Bank Center

West – San Diego, California
Location: Golden Gymnasium

Elite Eight – Evansville, Indiana

All-tournament team
 Alex Stein (Southern Indiana)
 Daulton Hommes (Point Loma)
 Tim Guers (Saint Anselm)
 Joey Withus (Northwest Missouri State)
 Trevor Hudgins (Northwest Missouri State)

References 

 2019 Division II Men's Basketball Official Bracket

Tournament
NCAA Division II men's basketball tournament
NCAA Division II basketball tournament
NCAA Division II basketball tournament
Basketball competitions in Evansville, Indiana
Basketball in Canyon, Texas
College basketball tournaments in Indiana
College basketball tournaments in Texas